Galashiels is a town in the Scottish Borders with a population of around 12,600.  Its name is often colloquially shortened to "Gala".  The town is a major commercial centre for the Borders region with extensive history in the textile industry. Galashiels is the location of Heriot-Watt University's School of Textiles and Design.

History

To the west of the town there is an ancient earthwork known as the Picts' Work Ditch or Catrail. It extends many miles south and its height and width vary. There is no agreement about the purpose of the earthwork. There is another ancient site on the north-western edge of the town, at Torwoodlee, an Iron Age hill fort, with a later broch known as Torwoodlee Broch built in the western quarter of the hill fort, and overlapping some of the defensive ditches of the original fort. The Romans destroyed the broch in 140 CE, soon after it was completed.

The town's coat of arms shows two foxes reaching up to eat plums from a tree, and the motto is Sour Plums pronounced in Scots as soor plooms. This is a reference to an incident in 1337 when a raiding party of English soldiers were picking wild plums close to the town and were caught by Scots who came across them by chance and slaughtered them all.

On a hillside to the north of the town, Buckholm Tower is a prominent structure that dates back to 1582 and replaced an earlier tower built on the same site but destroyed around 1570.

In 1599 Galashiels received its Burgh Charter, an event celebrated every summer since the 1930s by the "Braw Lads’ Gathering", with riders on horseback parading through the town. Galashiels Burgh Chambers were designed in the Scottish Renaissance style and completed in 1867. 

The Paton Street drill hall was completed in the late 19th century.

The textile trade caused Galashiels' population to increase dramatically from 800 residents at the start of the nineteenth century to 19,553 by 1890. A connection with the town's mill history, the Mill Lade, still links the town from near the site of mills at Wheatlands Road, to Netherdale, via Wilderhaugh, Bank Street, the Fountain and next to the Tesco/retail development Street.

Governance

Local government services for Galashiels are provided by Scottish Borders Council. There is also a community council covering the town.

Galashiels was designated a burgh of barony in 1599 and later became a police burgh by 1868. Galashiels Burgh Chambers on Albert Place was built in 1867. 

When elected county councils were created in 1890 under the Local Government (Scotland) Act 1889, burghs which met certain criteria were excluded from the area under the control of the county councils. There was disagreement between Galashiels and Selkirkshire County Council as to whether these criteria applied to Galashiels. The case went to court, and the Scottish Supreme Court found that Galashiels was entirely responsible for its own affairs and should neither be represented on nor taxed by Selkirkshire County Council. Further local government reform in 1930 brought the burgh of Galashiels within the area controlled by the county council, with the town being reclassified as a small burgh, ceding most of its functions to the county council.

In 1975 local government across Scotland was reformed under the Local Government (Scotland) Act 1973. The burghs and counties were abolished as administrative areas, replaced with a two-tier system of upper-tier regions and lower-tier districts. Galashiels therefore became part of the Ettrick and Lauderdale district within the Borders region. Ettrick and Lauderdale District Council used Galashiels Burgh Chambers as its headquarters. Further local government reform in 1996 abolished the regions and districts, since when Galashiels has been administered by Scottish Borders Council.

In culture

Robert Burns wrote two poems about Galashiels, "Sae Fair Her Hair" and "Braw Lads". The latter is sung by some of the townsfolk each year at the Braw Lads Gathering. Sir Walter Scott built his home, Abbotsford, just across the River Tweed from Galashiels. The Sir Walter Scott Way, a long-distance path from Moffat to Cockburnspath, passes through Galashiels.

There is some largely good-hearted rivalry between some of the Galashiels townsfolk and those of other border towns, particularly Hawick, the next largest town in the Scottish Borders. Galashiels' citizens often refer to their rival as dirty Hawick while the 'Teries' retort that Galashiels's residents are pail merks, supposedly because their town was the last to be plumbed into the mains water system and so residents had to rely on buckets as toilets.

Galashiels was also home to the author of the famous Scottish song, "Coulters Candy". Robert Coltart was a weaver in the town, but also made confectionery in nearby Melrose. The song was created as an advertisement, and hence was renamed as "Sugar Candy" when played by the BBC. The song is possibly better known by the first line of its chorus - "Ally, bally, ally bally bee". Coltart died in 1890.  A statue of Coltart now stands in the Market Square.

The 1985 Marillion hit single Kayleigh was partially inspired by events that took place in Galashiels as the band's lead singer Fish spent some time in the town in his earlier years. In 2012 the Scottish Borders Council undertook work to revamp the Market Square with lyrics of the song inscribed into the paving slabs. Fish officially reopened the square on completion later that year.

A new £6.7m Great Tapestry of Scotland Centre opened in Galashiels on 21 August 2021 to house one of the world’s largest tapestries and community arts projects. The Great Tapestry of Scotland was hand stitched by over 1,000 people across Scotland and had been taken for display around the country throughout its six-years' creation, the original brainchild of Edinburgh-born author Alexander McCall Smith, whose vision it was to create a tapestry telling the history of Scotland. The new purpose-built gallery, visitor centre, café and workshop space has been created and, on the opening day, saw the 160th and final tapestry panel revealed by chief stitcher Dorie Wilkie, accompanied by McCall Smith himself.

The Pavilion Cinema in Market Street opened in 1922 as a cinema, dance hall and theatre, originally named the Playhouse. The auditorium was converted to a bingo hall in the 1960s. The building was refurbished in the early 1990s, with its original art-deco façade being restored. It is now a four-screen cinema.

Transport

In 1969, the historic Waverley Line which connected the Scottish Borders to the national rail network was closed as part of a wider series of cuts to British Railways. The closure led to a campaign for a return of rail to the region that never diminished.

Following years of campaigning, in 2006, the Waverley Railway (Scotland) Act was passed by the Scottish Parliament, which authorised a partial restoration of the service. The new Borders Railway, which links Galashiels with Edinburgh, saw four new stations built in Midlothian and three in the Scottish Borders.

The project is estimated to have cost £294 million and was completed in September 2015, with the formal opening on 9 September by the Queen. Trains from Galashiels railway station run every half-hour going down to hourly in the evening and on Sundays. Journey times between Tweedbank and Edinburgh take less than one hour.

The town also has a recently-opened Interchange building which replaces the old bus station, and is also situated next to the railway station. It has a café, and upstairs has office space that has been leased to businesses and organizations. It also has toilet and baby-changing facilities, and a travel helpdesk.

Education
The following are listed by Scottish Borders Council as being in the Galashiels area and are catchment schools for Galashiels Academy.

Primary schools
 Balmoral Primary
 Burgh Primary 
 Clovenfords Primary (moved from Caddonfoot in 2012)
 Fountainhall Primary, Midlothian
 Glendinning Terrace Primary
 Heriot Primary, Midlothian
 Langlee Primary
 Stow Primary
 St Margaret's Roman Catholic Primary
 St Peter's Primary
 Tweedbank Primary

Secondary schools
 Galashiels Academy

Further and Higher education

Netherdale in Galashiels is home to Heriot-Watt University's School of Textiles and Design, which is also a shared campus of Borders College.

Redevelopment
Despite the town's relatively low population, the early 2000s saw many new developments, including Asda, Boots pharmacy, Halfords, Marks & Spencer, Matalan, McDonald's, Next, Subway fast-food outlet and Tesco Extra. Most of these are on former mill and industrial estate sites, while other disused mills have been converted to living accommodation.

Unusual landmarks or local features
The town is home to the Glasite church, in danger of being lost, but still standing sandwiched between mills and shop buildings on High Street, Botany Lane and Roxburgh Street.

Netherdale is home to Gala RFC and Gala Fairydean Rovers, with the football and rugby stadiums adjoining each other at one end. The football club's main stand was built in 1963 to designs by Peter Womersley, based in nearby Gattonside. The cantilevered concrete structure, in the Brutalist style, is now protected as a Category A listed building.

Sport
The following sports clubs are based in Galashiels:
 Gala Cricket Club
 Gala Fairydean Rovers (association football)
 Gala RFC (rugby union)
 Galashiels Golf Club

Notable people
Dugald Butler (1862-1926) parish minister and historical author
Craig Chalmers (born 1968), rugby player
Thomas J Clapperton (1879-1962), sculptor
Archie Cochrane (1909-1988), epidemiologist
John Collins (born 1968), footballer
Jimmy Curran (1880-1963), athlete and athletics coach
Johnny Davidson MBE (born 1971), Tourette syndrome campaigner, subject of QED documentary John's Not Mad.
James Donald (1917-1993), actor
Scilla Elworthy (born 1943), Peace activist and founder of the Oxford Research Group
Russell Fairgrieve (1924-1999), politician
Douglas Ford (1918-1943), army officer
Danny Galbraith (born 1990), footballer
Rev Paton James Gloag (1823-1906) parish minister, Moderator in 1889
Andrew John Herbertson (1865–1915), geographer and Oxford don
Ross Kelly (born 1961), Television presenter
Arthur Lapworth (1872–1941), Scottish chemist
Ryan Mania (born 1989), winner of the 2013 Grand National
Mary Monica Maxwell-Scott (1852-1920), author
Sandy McDade (born 1964), actress
Judith Miller (born 1951), antiques expert
Andrew Murdison (1898-1968), rugby player
Thomas Paterson Noble FRSE, (1887-1959), surgeon
Chris Paterson (born 1978), rugby player
Rev K. M. Phin (1816-1888) parish minister, Moderator in 1877
Anne Redpath (1895-1965), artist
Bryan Redpath (born 1971), rugby player
Brian Shillinglaw (1939-2007), rugby player
Gregor Townsend (born 1973), rugby player

Climate
Galashiels has an oceanic climate. However, due to its elevated position and distance from the sea, it has colder winters and slightly warmer summers than coastal places such as Edinburgh, Dunbar and Eyemouth. Snow is also much more common in winter, and covers the ground for an average of 38 days a year in an average winter.

See also
List of places in Scotland
List of places in the Scottish Borders
Shieling

References

External links

 Galashiels Town Website
 GALASHIELS HISTORICAL PEACE PAGEANT (1919) GALASHIELS WAR MEMORIAL (1925) (archive films from the National Library of Scotland: Scottish Screen Archive)

 
Towns in the Scottish Borders
Populated places on the River Tweed
Eildon